Dhanurvidya Vilasamu or Dhanurvidyāvilāsamu (Telugu: ధనుర్విద్యా విలాసము) is a treatise about the ancient science of Dhanurvidya or Dhanurveda (Archery). It is originally written by Krishnamacharya in Sanskrit.

It is, translated, edited and introduced into Telugu by Veturi Prabhakara Sastry and published in 1950 by Government Oriental Manuscripts Library, Madras.

Content
 Gurusankīrtana 
 Siśyaraņa           
 Vidyāprabhāsuchena 
 Sakhandākhanda Kōdanḍadwaya-namōddēśa.
 Dhanurnirmāṇa-pramāṇapramukuha- viśāśavinibhaga 
 Mārgaṇaparigaņaņa-préņana 
 Thadvīdhānamāna-praśamsa 
 Punyōpasankhyāna 
 Paksaparimanapraśamsa
 Nishangaracaņapravacana
 Mourvidhānakadhana
 Anguļithrāņaprakīrtana
 Jyārōpaņaprõkaraņa 
 Dhanururdvādhara-béāgavinibhāga
 Musṭiprakaraṇa  
 Sthānōpasankhyna 
 Saragrahaṇahastapratipādana 
 Sandhānakramavivaraṇa
 Ākarśaṇahasta Prastavana
 Bānahaśtaksetra
 Dṛsțilaksaņānvīkśana 
 Dhanurākarśaņa kowśala
 Saravyāpārayōgya tidhivāratārāka karaṇa
 Khuralikāranga 
 Rangapravēša 
 Dhanussarapūjāyôyena 
 Gurupraņāma 
 Saraśarīsanagrahana  paryātocona
 Pousyaparya 
 Lakśyasuddhi
 Lakśyavēdika
 Nārācamõcena 
 Citralakşyabhēdhanōpāya 
 Śabdalakşyasarād byāsa 
 Muştyanguļaniya manalaksananveksana 
 Duranikatosthala laksanalaskya 
 Radharohaṇa
 Gazaróhapņasaratira yöga 
 Hayarohana
 Śarābyasa
 Dūrāpāti
 Śaraprayogasamayā samaya 
 Śaragamanagunadōşa
 Divryāstramantra tantraprayōga 
 Vistaraprastāvana

References

Archery
Sanskrit literature
Translations into Telugu